Nauman Islam Shaikh (born 24 July 1978) is a Pakistani politician who has been a member of the National Assembly of Pakistan, since August 2018. Previously, he was member of the National Assembly from 2008 to May 2018.

Early life
He was born on Sukkur 24 July 1978.

Political career

He was elected to the National Assembly of Pakistan as a candidate of Pakistan Peoples Party (PPP) from Constituency NA-198 (Sukkur-cum-Shikarpur-I) in 2008 Pakistani general election. He received 74,086 votes and defeated Tahir Hussain Shah, a candidate of Pakistan Muslim League (Q) (PML-Q).

He was re-elected to the National Assembly as a candidate of PPP from Constituency NA-198 (Sukkur-cum-Shikarpur-I) in 2013 Pakistani general election. He received 52,684 votes and defeated Munawar Ali Chohan, a candidate of Muttahida Qaumi Movement.

He was re-elected to the National Assembly as a candidate of PPP from Constituency NA-207 (Sukkur-II) in 2018 Pakistani general election.

References

Living people
Pakistan People's Party politicians
Sindhi people
People from Sindh
1978 births
Pakistani MNAs 2013–2018
Pakistani MNAs 2008–2013
Pakistani MNAs 2018–2023